Sankt Koloman is a municipality in the Hallein district in the Austrian state of Salzburg.

Geography
Sankt Koloman lies in the Tennengau on the high plateau of the Salzach valley between Bad Vigaun and Kuchl. Sudivisions are Oberlangenberg (previously known as Fürberg ), Taugl, and Tauglboden.

References

Cities and towns in Hallein District